Uiryeong Yeo clan was one of the Korean clans which is descended from the last king of Baekje, Buyeo Pung. After Buyeo Pung was captured by army of Tang, the prince was forcibly sent to inland China. He moved to Goryeo and was appointed as Prince of Uichun in Goryeo. Their Bon-gwan was in Uiryeong County, South Gyeongsang Province. According to the research in 2000, the number of Uiryeong Yeo clan was 17780.

See also 
 Korean clan names of foreign origin

References

External links 
 

Korean clan names of Chinese origin